Russell William Pence (March 11, 1900 – August 11, 1971) was a Major League Baseball pitcher. He pitched for the Chicago White Sox in 1921.

External links

1900 births
1971 deaths
Major League Baseball pitchers
Baseball players from Illinois
Chicago White Sox players
People from Marine, Illinois